Lee Eddy (born May 12, 1979) is an American stage actress, comedian and writer best known for her work on Red vs. Blue and Camp Camp.

Early life and career 
She was born in Shreveport, Louisiana where as a child she was a member of The Peter Pan Players. Eddy regularly performs in Austin, Texas.

Eddy has been voted "Best Actress in Austin" in The Austin Chronicle's Reader poll for 2004, 2005 and 2006.

She frequently works with Rooster Teeth, voicing the character of Four Seven Niner in Red vs. Blue, Gwen in their animated series, Camp Camp, and playing Lex in their live-action drama Day 5.

Personal life 
She is married to actor and screenwriter Macon Blair and have a son Buck (born 2015).

Filmography

Film

Television

Web

References

External links 

 
 
Delighted Lee
 New York Times Review "Not Clown"

American women comedians
American stage actresses
Living people
Actresses from Louisiana
Writers from Shreveport, Louisiana
Actors from Shreveport, Louisiana
1986 births
21st-century American women